Siv Marianne Ahrne (born 25 May 1940) is a Swedish film director and screenwriter. She has directed ten films between 1970 and 1997. Her 1976 film Near and Far Away won the award for Best Director at the 13th Guldbagge Awards. Her 1978 film The Walls of Freedom was entered into the 11th Moscow International Film Festival. According to film historian Gwendolyn Audrey Foster, Ahrne was one of the first women to make documentary films in Sweden, and Foster noted that Ahrne's films have received little attention in the United States.

Selected filmography
 Near and Far Away (1976)
 The Walls of Freedom (1979)
 Flickan vid stenbänken (1989)

References

External links

 

1940 births
Living people
Swedish film directors
Swedish screenwriters
People from Lund
Best Director Guldbagge Award winners
Swedish women film directors
Swedish women screenwriters